A current differencing buffered amplifier (CDBA) is a multi-terminal active component with two inputs and two outputs and developed by Cevdet Acar and Serdar Özoğuz. Its block diagram can be seen from the figure. It is derived from the current feedback amplifier (CFA).

Basic operation 

The characteristic equation of this element can be given as:

, 
, 
.

Here, current through z-terminal follows the difference of the currents through p-terminal and n-terminal. Input terminals p and n are internally grounded. The difference of the input currents are converted into the output voltage Vw, therefore CDBA element can be considered as a special type of current feedback amplifier with differential current input and grounded y input.

The CDBA is simplifying the implementation, free from parasitic capacitances, able to operate in the frequency range of more than hundreds of MHz (even GHz!), and suitable for current mode operation while, it also provides a voltage output.

Several voltage and current mode continuous-time filters, oscillators, analog multipliers, inductance simulators and a PID controller have been developed using this active element.

References
Acar, C., and Ozoguz, S., “A new versatile building block: current differencing buffered amplifier suitable for analog signal processing filters”, Microelectronics Journal, vol. 30, pp. 157–160, 1999.
Ali Ümit Keskin, "A Four Quadrant Analog Multiplier employing single CDBA", Analog Integrated Circuits and Signal Processing, vol. 40, no. 1, pp. 99–101, 2004.
Tangsrirat, W., Klahan, K., Kaewdang, K., and Surakampontorn, W., “Low-Voltage Wide-Band NMOS-Based Current Differencing Buffered Amplifier” ECTI Transactions on Electrical Eng., Electronics, and Communications, vol. 2, no. 1, pp. 15–22, 2004.

Electronic amplifiers